This article is a list of the musical compositions of Michael Haydn sorted by genre, and then chronologically when year of composition is indicated, otherwise alphabetically. The numbering in parentheses starting with the capital letter P refers to Perger catalogue. The MH numbers refer to the Sherman & Thomas catalog of 1993.

Instrumental music

Symphonies 

All of Michael Haydn's symphonies have at least 2 oboes, 2 bassoons, 2 horns and strings (first and second violins, violas and basses, but no cellos). Some symphonies add more instruments, such as trumpets and timpani in some of the C major symphonies. They are usually either in three or four movements. Continuo is explicitly called for only in the earlier works, and the modern editions usually follow the old practice of putting the bassoons, basses and the left hand of the continuo on a single staff below the violas' staff.

Many of Michael Haydn's symphonies were at first attributed to Joseph Haydn. Only one of them was first attributed to Wolfgang Amadeus Mozart.

 Symphony No. 1 in C major, MH 23, Perger 35 (1758?)
 Symphony No. 1A in D major, MH 24 (1758?)
 Symphony No. 1B in F major, MH 25 (1758?)
 Symphony No. 1C in E-flat major, MH 35 (Partita), Perger 1 (1760)
 Symphony No. 2 in C major, MH 37, Perger 2 (1761)
 Symphony No. 3 in G major, MH 26 (Divertimento), (1763)
 Symphony No. 4 in B-flat major, MH 62, Perger 51 (1763)
 Symphony No. 5 in A major, MH 63, Perger 3 (1763)
 Symphony No. 6 in C major, MH 64, Perger 4 (1764)
 Symphony No. 7 in E major, MH 65, Perger 5 (1764)
 Symphony No. 8 in D major, MH 69, Perger 38 (1764)
 Symphony No. 9 in D major, MH 50, Perger 36 (1760?)
 Symphony No. 10 in F major, MH 51, Perger 45 (1764?)
 Symphony No. 11 in B-flat major, MH 82, Perger 9 (1766)
 Symphony No. 12 in G major, MH 108, Perger 7 (1768)
 Symphony No. 13 in D major, MH 132, Perger 37 (1768?)
 Symphony No. 14 in B-flat major, MH 133, Perger 52 (1771)
 Symphony No. 15 in D major, MH 150, Perger 41 (1771)
 Symphony No. 16 in A major, MH 152, Perger 6 (1771)
 Symphony No. 17 in E major, MH 151, Perger 44 (1771?)
 Symphony No. 18 in C major, MH 188, Perger 10 (1773)
 Symphony No. 19 in D major, MH 198, Perger 11 (1774)
 Symphony No. 20 in C major, MH 252, Perger 12 (1777)
 Symphony No. 21 in D major, MH 272, Perger 42 (1778)
 Symphony No. 22 in F major, MH 284, Perger 14, Sherman 23 (1779)
 Symphony No. 23 in D major, MH 287, Perger 43, Sherman 22 (1779)
 Symphony No. 24 in A major, MH 302, Perger 15 (1781)
 Symphony No. 25 in G major, MH 334, Perger 16 (1783)
 Symphony No. 26 in E-flat major, MH 340, Perger 17 (1783)
 Symphony No. 27 in B-flat major, Opus 1 No. 2, Perger 18, MH 358 (1784)
 Symphony No. 28 in C major, Opus 1 No. 3, Perger 19, MH 384 (1784)
 Symphony No. 29 in D minor, MH 393, Perger 20 (1784)
 Symphony No. 30 in D major, MH 399, Perger 21 (1785)
 Symphony No. 31 in F major, MH 405, Perger 22 (1785)
 Symphony No. 32 in D major, MH 420, Perger 23 (1786)
 Symphony No. 33 in B-flat major, MH 425, Perger 24/82 (1786)
 Symphony No. 34 in E-flat major, MH 473, Perger 26 (1788)
 Symphony No. 35 in G major, MH 474, Perger 27 (1788)
 Symphony No. 36 in B-flat major, MH 475, Perger 28 (1788)
 Symphony No. 37 in D major, MH 476, Perger 29 (1788)
 Symphony No. 38 in F major, MH 477, Perger 30 (1788)
 Symphony No. 39 in C major, MH 478, Perger 31 (1788)
 Symphony No. 40 in F major, MH 507, Perger 32 (1789)
 Symphony No. 41 in A major, MH 508, Perger 33 (1789)
 Finale to a symphony in B-flat major, MH 184
 Menuetto for symphony No. 33 in B-flat major, MH 652, Perger 82
 Symphony in C major (lost), MH A7
 Symphony in F major, MH 118a, Perger 46

Concertos

With two exceptions, it is believed all of Haydn's concerti were written in Salzburg.

 Cello Concerto in B-flat major, MH deest
 Concerto in C major for Organ and Viola, MH 41, Perger 55
 Flute Concerto No. 1 in D major, MH 81, Perger 54
 Flute Concerto No. 2 in D major, MH 105, Perger 56
 Harpsichord Concerto in F major (fragment), MH 268, Perger 57
 Horn Concerto in D major, MH 53
 Horn Concerto in D major, MH 134, Perger 134
 Trumpet Concerto No. 1 in C major, MH 60 (1784) 
 Trumpet Concerto No. 2 in D major, MH 104
 Violin Concerto in B-flat major, MH 36, Perger 53; also Hoboken.VIIa:B1
 Violin Concerto in G major, MH 52; also Hoboken.VIIa:G1
 Violin Concerto in A major, MH 207
 Larghetto per il trombone concertato in F major, MH 61, Perger 34

Serenades
 Cassation in D major, Perger 89, MH 171
 Cassation in E-flat major, MH 54
 Cassation in E-flat major, MH 55
 Cassation in E-flat major, Perger 90, MH 208
 Divertimento in B-flat major, MH 463
 Divertimento in B-flat major, Perger 92, MH 199
 Divertimento in C major, Perger 97 (lost), MH A8
 Divertimento in D major, MH 68
 Divertimento in D major, Perger 93, MH 319
 Divertimento in D major, Perger 95, MH 418
 Divertimento in D major, Perger 100, MH 464
 Divertimento in G major, Perger 94, MH 406
 Divertimento in G major, Perger 96, MH 518
 Notturno in F major, Perger 106, MH 185
 Notturno in G major, MH 153
 Notturno solenne in E-flat major, MH deest
 Pastorello in C major, Perger 91, MH 83
 Partita in F major, Perger 107 (lost), MH 59
 Quintet in E-flat major, Perger 111), MH 516
 Serenade in D major, Perger 85, MH 407
 Serenade in D major, Perger 87, MH 86 (1767)

Incidental music
 Zaïre, Perger 13, MH 255

Ballets
 Ballet, MH 141
 Der Traum Perger 133, MH 84
 Hermann Perger 84, MH 148

Dances
 12 Menuetti, MH 136
 12 Menuetti, MH 197
 12 Menuetti, MH 250
 12 Menuetti, Perger 77, MH 550
 12 Menuetti, Perger 78, MH 693
 12 Menuetti, Perger 79, MH 135
 12 Menuetti, Perger 80, MH 274
 12 Menuetti, Perger 81, MH 193
 2 Inglese in C major, Perger 83), MH 529
 6 Menuetti, MH 137
 6 Menuetti, MH 413
 6 Menuetti, Perger 69, MH 333
 6 Menuetti, Perger 70, MH 354
 6 Menuetti, Perger 71, MH 414
 6 Menuetti, Perger 73, MH 423
 6 Menuetti, Perger 75, MH 499
 6 Menuettini Tedeschi, Perger 72, MH 416
 6 Menuettini Tedeschi, Perger 74, MH 424
 6 Menuettini Tedeschi, Perger 76, MH 417
 6 Tedeschi in G major (sketches), MH 570
 Coda to the 6 Menuettini Tedeschi P 76 in D major, MH 500

Marches
 6 Marches (fragment), MH 288
 March in C major, Perger 61, MH 440
 March in C major, Perger 66, MH 823
 March in D major, MH 211
 March in D major, MH 432
 March in D major, Perger 58, MH 67
 March in D major, Perger 60, MH 439
 March in D major, Perger 62, MH 441
 March in D major, Perger 63, MH 339
 March in D major, Perger 64, MH 515
 March in D major, Perger 68, MH 220
 March in D major, Perger 93, MH 320
 March in F major, Perger 59, MH 421
 Marcia Turchese in C major, Perger 65, MH 601
 National-Marsch in C major, Perger 67 (lost), MH 569
 March in C Major, MH 823

Quintets
 Romanze for horn quintet in F major, MH 806
 String Quintet in B-flat major, Perger 105, MH 412
 String Quintet in C major, Perger 108, MH 187
 String Quintet in F major, Perger 110, MH 367
 String Quintet in F major, Perger 112, MH 411
 String Quintet in G major, Perger 109, MH 189

Quartets
 Andantino for string quartet in B-flat major, Perger 136, MH 175
 Flute Quartet in D major, P 117
 Flute Quartet in F major, P deest
 Piece for string quartet in G major, MH 664
 Quartet for violin, English horn, cello and continuo in C major, Perger 115, MH 600
 String Quartet in A major, Perger 121, MH 299
 String Quartet in A major, Perger 122, MH 310
 String Quartet in B-flat major, Perger 123, MH 209
 String Quartet in B-flat major, Perger 124, MH 308
 String Quartet in B-flat major, Perger 125, MH 316
 String Quartet in C major, Perger 116, MH 313
 String Quartet in D major, MH 314
 String Quartet in E-flat major, Perger 118, MH 309
 String Quartet in F major, Perger 119, MH 312
 String Quartet in G major, MH 173a
 String Quartet in G major, MH 315
 String Quartet in G major, Perger 104, MH 172
 String Quartet in G major, Perger 135 (fragment), MH 174
 String Quartet in G minor, Perger 120, MH 311

Trio sonatas
 Divertimento à 3 in A major, MH 8
 Divertimento à 3 in B-flat major, MH 10
 Divertimento à 3 in C major, Perger 98, MH 179
 Divertimento à 3 in C major, Perger 99, MH 27
 Divertimento à 3 in D major, MH 173
 Divertimento à 3 in D major, Perger 101, MH 5
 Divertimento à 3 in E-flat major, Perger 102, MH 9
 Divertimento à 3 in E major, MH 7
 Divertimento à 3 in G major, Perger 103, MH 6
 Sonata for 2 violins and organ in B-flat major, Perger 126 (lost), MH A9

Duo sonatas

Hieronymus Graf von Colloredo commissioned Haydn to write six duos for violin and viola. Haydn fell ill after completing the fourth, so he asked Mozart to write the other two (K. 423 and K. 424). The set of six was presented as all Haydn's, and Colloredo was unable to "detect in them Mozart's obvious workmanship."

 Duo for violin and viola in C major, Perger 127, MH 335
 Duo for violin and viola in D major, Perger 128, MH 336
 Duo for violin and viola in E major, Perger 129, MH 337
 Duo for violin and viola in F major, Perger 130, MH 338

Solo sonatas
 6 Menuetti for violin and continuo, MH 210
 Divertimento for flute and harpsichord in G major, MH 273

Keyboard
 Allegretto in F major, MH 471
 Allegro in G major, MH 470
 Andante in C major, MH 466
 Anweisung von einem Haupt-Ton in alle übrige Töne zu kommen, MH 318
 Beispiele zur Übung im bezifferten Grundbass, MH 433
 Cadenze e versetti (fragment), MH 435
 Cadenze e versetti, Perger 131, MH 176
 Canonic studies, MH 568
 Contrapuntal studies, MH 177
 Contrapuntal studies, MH 434
 Deutscher Tanz in A major, MH 465
 Gewöhnliche Signaturen des Generalbasses, MH 317
 Menuetto in E minor, MH 472
 Menuetto in F major, MH 469
 Piece in D major, MH 467
 Piece in E-flat major, MH 468
 Preludes and Finale, MH 436
 Variations in C major, Perger 132, MH 108a
 Variations on 'Gott erhalte Franz der Kaiser', MH 771

Unknown instrumentation
 Piece in C major without title, MH 571

Sacred vocal music

Antiphons
 Alma Redemptoris Mater in A major, MH 103
 Alma Redemptoris Mater in D major, MH 164
 Alma Redemptoris Mater in D major (fragment), MH 92
 Alma Redemptoris Mater in D major (K V:19a), MH 637
 Alma Redemptoris Mater in E-flat major (K V:19b), MH 270
 Alma Redemptoris Mater in F major, MH 163
 Antiphonarium Romanum, MH 533
 Ave Maris Stella in G major, MH 49
 Ave Regina in A major, MH 14
 Ave Regina in C major, MH 227
 Ave Regina in C major (K V:14a), MH 140
 Ave Regina in E-flat major, MH 127
 Ave Regina in F major, MH 457
 Ave Regina in G major (K V:14b), MH 650
 Crucem sanctam in B-flat major (K V:10), MH 201
 Deutsches Alma Redemptoris Mater in D major, MH 676
 Deutsches Ave Maris Stella in G major, MH 677
 Deutsches Regina caeli in F major (K VI:25), MH 694
 Deutsches Salve Regina in B-flat major, MH 675
 Regina caeli in B-flat major, MH 191
 Regina caeli in B-flat major, MH 264
 Regina caeli in C major (K V:15a), MH 80
 Regina caeli in C major, MH 22
 Regina caeli in C major, MH 263
 Regina caeli in D major, MH 128
 Regina caeli in E-flat major (K V:15d), MH 93
 Regina caeli in E major, MH 94
 Salve Regina, MH deest
 Salve Regina in A major (K V:13d), MH 634
 Salve Regina in B-flat major (K V:13a), MH 283
 Salve Regina in B-flat major (K V:13b3), MH 31
 Salve Regina in B-flat major, MH 20
 Salve Regina in B-flat major, MH 21
 Salve Regina in B-flat major, MH 90
 Salve Regina in B-flat major, MH 231
 Salve Regina in C major (K V:13b1), MH 29
 Salve Regina in C major (K V:13b6), MH 34
 Salve Regina in C major, MH 19
 Salve Regina in C major, MH 91
 Salve Regina in D major (K V:13b2), MH 30
 Salve Regina in D major (K V:13b5), MH 33
 Salve Regina in D major (K V:13e), MH 534
 Salve Regina in F major, MH 347
 Salve Regina in G major (K V:13b4), MH 32
 Salve Regina in G major (K V:13c), MH 129
 Sancti Dei omnes in D minor (K V:25a), MH 328
 Surgite Sancti in E-flat major (K V:9f), MH 327

Cantatas
 Applicatio (K V:21), MH 279
 Canticum in Tono Peregrino (K V:20), MH 323
 Der Christ auf Golgotha in G minor, MH 831
 Die Ölberg Andacht (K VI:14), MH 625
 Jubelfeier (K VI:31), MH 449

Canticles
 Asperges me in F major (K V:7a), MH 572
 Asperges me in F major (K V:7b), MH 573
 Asperges me in G minor, MH 98
 De Profundis in D minor (K IIb:16), MH 280
 Deutsches Te Deum in C major, MH 672
 Deutsches Te Deum in C major (K VI:19), MH 836
 Deutsches Tenebrae in E-flat major, MH 610
 Emicat meridies in F major (K IIb:4), MH 437
 Laeta quies in B-flat major (K IIb:17b), MH 400
 Laeta quies in F major (K IIb:17a), MH 253
 Lauda Sion in G major (K IIa:42), MH 215
 Libera me in B-flat major, MH 458
 Libera me in D minor, MH 431
 Libera me in E major, MH 459
 Litanei-Gesang in C major, MH 514
 Litanei-Gesang in C major (K VI:9), MH 368
 Litaniae de Beata Virgine Maria in A major, MH 258
 Litaniae de Beata Virgine Maria in A minor, MH 212
 Litaniae de Beata Virgine Maria in A minor (K IV:17b), MH 120
 Litaniae de Beata Virgine Maria in C major (K IV:16), MH 157
 Litaniae de Beata Virgine Maria in C major (K IV:17a), MH 156
 Litaniae de Beata Virgine Maria in F major, MH 282
 Litaniae de Venerabili Sacramento in B-flat major (K IV:10), MH 110
 Litaniae de Venerabili Sacramento in B-flat major (K IV:13), MH 228
 Litaniae de Venerabili Sacramento in B-flat major (K IV:15), MH 532
 Litaniae de Venerabili Sacramento in F major (K IV:14), MH 66
 Litaniae Lauretenae in B-flat major (K IV:9), MH 74
 Litaniae Lauretenae in B-flat major (K IV:9) (revised), MH 88
 Litaniae Lauretenae in C major (K IV:11), MH 71
 Litaniae Lauretenae in G major, MH 89
 Litanie della Madonna in D major (K IV:12), MH 330
 Miraculorum patrator in G major (K IIb:18), MH 426
 Pange lingua in C major (K V:12c), MH 395
 Responsoria ad Matutinum in Coena Domini (K V:9a), MH 276
 Responsoria ad Matutinum in Nativitate Domini (K V:9e), MH 639
 Responsoria in festo Corporis Christi in C major (K V:11), MH 213
 Responsoria in festo Resurrectione Domini in G major (K V:9d), MH 669
 Responsoria in Parasceve (K V:9b), MH 277
 Responsoria in Sabbato Sancto (K V:9c), MH 278
 Stella caeli in F major (K V:18), MH 394
 Stella caeli in F major (K V:18b), MH 830
 Stella coeli in F major (K V:18a), MH 306
 Tantum ergo in C major (K V:12a), MH 772
 Tantum ergo in C major (K V:12e), MH 404
 Tantum ergo in C major (K V:12i), MH 460
 Tantum ergo in C major, MH 249
 Tantum ergo in C major, MH 265
 Tantum ergo in C major, MH 396
 Tantum ergo in D minor (K V:12d), MH 130
 Tantum ergo in G major (K V:12b), MH 773
 Tantum ergo in G major (K V:12k), MH 535
 Te Deum in C major (K V:1), MH 28
 Te Deum in C major (K V:2), MH 145
 Te Deum in C major (K V:6), MH 415
 Te Deum in D major (K V:4), MH 800
 Te Deum in D major (K V:5), MH 829
 Tenebrae in A-flat major, MH 113
 Tenebrae in B-flat major (K V:8a), MH 305
 Tenebrae in C major, MH 125
 Tenebrae in C-sharp major (K V:8b), MH 824
 Tenebrae in E-flat major (K V:8c), MH 162
 Veni Sancte Spiritus in C major, MH 39
 Veni Sancte Spiritus in E-flat major (K IIa:39a), MH 366
 Veni Sancte Spiritus in G major, MH 96
 Veni Sancte Spiritus in G major, MH 161
 Vidi Aquam in C major, MH 99

Graduals
 Ab ortu solis in B-flat major (K IIa:45), MH 356
 Ad Dominum, dum tribulater in C major (K IIa:46), MH 487
 Adjutor in opportunitatibus in G major (K IIa:18), MH 446
 Adjuvabit eam Deus in E-flat major (K IIb:47), MH 375
 Angelis suis in D major (K IIa:21), MH 451
 Ascendit Deus in A major (K IIa:37), MH 365
 Audi filia in F major (K IIb:31), MH 357
 Ave Maria in C major (K IIb:30), MH 388
 Beata gens in E-flat major (K IIa:60), MH 511
 Beatus vir in C major (K IIa:44), MH 410
 Beatus vir in E-flat major (K IIb:43), MH 398
 Benedicam Dominum in F major (K IIa:56), MH 492
 Benedicite Dominum in E major (K IIb:12), MH 381
 Benedicta et venerabilis in E-flat major (K IIb:29), MH 374
 Benedictus Dominus in F major (K IIa:14), MH 495
 Benedictus es Domine in B-flat major (K IIa:41), MH 369
 Benedictus es Domine in G major, MH 348
 Benedictus qui venit in B-flat major (K IIa:7), MH 391
 Bonum est confidere in A major (K IIa:59), MH 510
 Bonum est confidere in B-flat major (K IIa:58), MH 509
 Cantate Domino in A major (K IIb:36), MH 828
 Caro mea vere in F major (K IIb:44), MH 513
 Christus factus est in C minor, MH 38
 Cognoverunt discipuli in D major (K IIa:31), MH 482
 Confitebuntur caeli in D major, MH 810
 Confitebuntur caeli in D major (K IIb:20), MH 363
 Confitemini Domino in D major (K IIa:38), MH 402
 Confitemini Domino in F major (K IIa:36), MH 696
 Constitues eos principes in A major (K III:7), MH 373
 Convertere Domine in B-flat major (K IIa:50), MH 490
 Custodi me Domine in G major (K IIa:54), MH 504
 De funesta necis domo in C major, MH 456
 De profundis in D major (K IIa:67), MH 494
 Dextera Domini in A major (K IIa:33), MH 484
 Dicite in gentibus in C major (K IIb:22), MH 364
 Dilectus meus in A major (K IIb:7), MH 386
 Dilexisti justitiam in D major (K IIb:23), MH 376
 Dirigatur oratio mea in G major (K IIa:62), MH 520
 Dolorosa et lacrymabilis in C minor (K IIa:26), MH 360
 Domine Dominus noster in D major (K IIa:53), MH 491
 Domine praevenisti in C major (K IIb:46), MH 359
 Domine quis habitabit in E major (K IIb:3), MH 403
 Domine refugium in A major (K IIa:64), MH 521
 Dominus regnavit in B-flat major (K IIa:17), MH 498
 Ecce ancilla Domini in B-flat major (K IIb:5), MH 653
 Ecce quam bonum in B-flat major (K IIa:65), MH 522
 Ecce sacerdos in E minor (K IIb:42), MH 345
 Ecce Virgo concipiet in E-flat major (K IIb:6), MH 408
 Effuderunt sanguinem in D major (K IIa:12), MH 392
 Egregie Doctor Paule in B-flat major, MH 190
 Eripe me in F-sharp minor (K IIa:25), MH 481
 Esto mihi in Deum in A major (K IIa:52), MH 503
 Ex Sion species in B-flat major (K IIa:2), MH 443
 Exsultabunt Sancti in G major (K IIb:13), MH 370
 Exsurge Domine in E-flat major (K IIa:23), MH 479
 Felix es sacra in F major (K IIb:11), MH 379
 Germinavit radix Jesse in G major (K V:22a), MH 651
 Gloria et honore in G major (K IIb:38), MH 526
 Gloriosus Deus in C major (K IIb:14), MH 352
 Hic est discipulus in B-flat major (K IIa:10), MH 344
 Hodie scietis in B-flat major (K IIa:5), MH 656
 In Deo speravit in C major (K IIa:55), MH 505
 In die resurrectionis in B-flat major (K IIa:30), MH 362
 In omnem terram in B-flat major (K III:17), MH 525
 Ipsa Virgo virginum in D major (K IIb:49), MH 670
 Jacta cogitatum tuum in E-flat major (K IIa:47), MH 488
 Juravit Dominus in E-flat major (K IIb:41), MH 382
 Justus ut palma in B-flat major (K IIb:45), MH 389
 Laetatus sum in B-flat major (K IIa:24), MH 480
 Laetatus sum in F major (K IIa:61), MH 519
 Laudate pueri in F major (K IIa:11), MH 342
 Laudibus mons in G major (K IIb:19), MH 556
 Liberasti nos in C major (K IIa:66), MH 523
 Locus iste in F major (K IIb:25), MH 383
 Misit Dominus verbum in A major (K IIa:15), MH 496
 Ne timeas Maria in B-flat major (K III:1), MH 409
 Nimis honorati sunt in G major (K III:16), MH 380
 Nunc dimittis in D major (K IIb:1), MH 355
 Oculi omnium in D major (K III:43), MH 401
 Omnes de Saba in G major (K IIa:13), MH 350
 Paratum cor meum in D major (K IIa:63), MH 524
 Petite et accipietis in B-flat major (K IIb:35), MH 798
 Post partum Virgo in G major (K IIb:26), MH 528
 Priusquam te formarem in C major (K IIb:8), MH 372
 Probasti Domine in F major (K IIb:39), MH 378
 Prope est Dominus in C major (K IIa:4), MH 445
 Propitius esto Domine in F major (K IIa:48), MH 489
 Protector noster in F major (K IIa:49), MH 501
 Qui sedes Domine in B-flat major (K IIa:3), MH 444
 Redemptionem misit in F major (K IIa:32), MH 483
 Regnavit Dominus in C major (K IIa:35), MH 486
 Respice Domine in G major (K IIa:57), MH 506
 Salvos fac nos in B-flat major (K IIb:2), MH 351
 Sciant gentes in G major (K IIa:19), MH 447
 Sederunt principes in G major (K IIa:9), MH 343
 Speciosus forma in G major (K IIb:24), MH 377
 Surrexit Christus in E major (K IIa:34), MH 485
 Tecum principium in G major (K IIa:6), MH 390
 Tenuisti manum in F major (K IIa:27), MH 695
 Timebunt gentes in E major (K IIa:16), MH 497
 Timete Dominum in G major (K III:14), MH 385
 Tollite portas in C major (K IIb:28), MH 387
 Tribulationes cordis mei in C major (K IIa:22), MH 453
 Tu es Deus in C major (K IIa:20), MH 448
 Tu es Petrus in C major (K IIb:9), MH 397
 Tu es vas electionis in A major (K IIb:10), MH 353
 Universi qui te in F major (K IIa:1), MH 442
 Venite filii in F major (K IIa:51), MH 502
 Victimae Paschali laudes in F major (K IIa:29), MH 361
 Viderunt omnes in F major (K IIa:8), MH 341
 Virgo prudentissima in C major (K V:23), MH 635
 Vos estis in C major (K IIb:37), MH 554

Hymns
 Dedit mihi in B-flat major, MH 77
 Deus in adjutorium in B-flat major (K IV:1c), MH 454
 Deus tuorum militum in A minor, MH 326
 Deus tuorum militum in C major, MH 158
 Ex ore infantium in C major (K I:30), MH 331
 Gaude Virgo in D major (K V:22b), MH 638
 Hymne an den Schöpfer der Natur in F major, MH 194* Iam sol recedit igneus in F major (K V:17), MH 595
 Invictus heros in A minor, MH 78
 Iste confessor in A major (K V:16), MH 40
 Jam faces lictor in F major, MH 79
 Jesu corona Virginum in A minor, MH 100
 Jesu redemptor omnium in C major (K V:25b), MH 329
 O salutaris hostia in D major, MH 101
 Salvete flores in D major (K IV:2b), MH 307
 Urbs Jerusalem in G major, MH 75
 Vexilla regis in D minor, MH 126

Masses 
 Deutsches Hochamt (German Mass)
 Deutsches Hochamt in A major (K VI:3), MH 536
 Deutsches Hochamt in B-flat major (K VI:6c), MH 560
 German Mass in E-flat major (K VI:6b), MH 561
 German Mass in F major (K VI:6a), MH 562
 Deutsches Hochamt in B-flat major (K VI:2), MH 602
 German Mass in F major (K VI:4), MH 611
 Deutsches Hochamt in C major (K VI:5), MH 629
 Deutsches Hochamt in B-flat major (K VI:1) (lost), MH 642
 German Mass in F major, MH 671
 Gloria del Signore Giuseppe Haydn, MH 596
 Gloria et Credo ad Missam Sancti Gabrielis in C major (K I:5), MH 112
 Gloria et Credo ad Missam Sancti Raphaelis in C major (K I:6), MH 111
 In coena Domini ad Missam in C major, MH 628
 In gloria Dei Patris in D major, MH 797
 Missa Beatissimae Virginis Mariae in C major, MH 15
 Missa Dolorum Beatae Virginis Mariae in A minor (K I:3) (lost), MH 57
 Missa Hispanica in C major (K I:17), MH 422
 Missa in C major, MH 44
 Missa in C major (K I:35), MH 42
 Missa in C major (lost), MH 18
 Missa in D minor (fragment), MH 2
 Missa in D minor (fragment) (K I:31a), MH 3
 Missa pro Quadragesima in F major (K I:20), MH 551
 Missa Quadragesimalis in A minor, MH 552
 Missa Sanctae Theresiae in D major (K I:22), MH 796
 Missa in honorem Sanctae Ursulae in C major (K I:18), MH 546
 Missa Sanctae Crucis in A minor (K I:16), MH 56
 Missa Sanctorum Cyrilli et Methodii in C major (K I:2), MH 13
 Missa Sancti Aloysii in B-flat major (K I:12), MH 257
 Missa Sancti Amandi in C major (K I:10), MH 229
 Missa Sancti Dominici in C major (K I:14), MH 419
 Missa Sancti Francisci Seraphici in C major (K I:25), MH 43
 Missa Sancti Francisci Seraphici in C major (K I:31b), MH 119
 Missa Sancti Francisci Seraphici in D minor (K I:23), MH 826
 Missa Sancti Gabrielis in C major, MH 17
 Missa Sancti Gotthardi in C major (K I:15), MH 530
 Missa Sancti Hieronymi in C major (K I:11), MH 254
 Missa Sancti Joannis Nepomuceni in C major (K I:9), MH 182
 Missa Sancti Josephi in C major (K I:7), MH 16
 Missa Sancti Leopoldi in G major (K I:24), MH 837
 Missa Sancti Michaelis in C major (K I:27), MH 12
 Missa Sancti Nicolai Tolentini in C major (K I:4a), MH 109
 Missa Sancti Nicolai Tolentini in C major (K I:4b), MH 154
 Missa Sancti Raphaelis in C major, MH 87
 Missa Sancti Ruperti in C major (K I:13), MH 322
 Missa Sanctissimae Trinitatis in B minor (K I:1), MH 1
 Missa tempore Quadragesimae in D minor (K I:19), MH 553

Motets
 Alleluia. Lauda Jerusalem (fragment), MH 4
 Civitatem in G major (lost), MH 47
 In Te mi Deus in C major, MH 230
 O festiva dies in C major, MH 159
 Spiritus Domini replevit in B-flat major, MH 45
 Surrexit Pastor bonus in C major, MH 160
 Vidi civitatem sanctam in C major, MH 48

Offertories
 Ad te Domine in G major (K III:3), MH 531
 Alma Dei creatoris in E-flat major (K III:2), MH 221
 Alme Deus in C major (K III:29), MH 332
 Anima nostra in D major, MH 146
 Anima nostra in G major (K III:13), MH 452
 Ave maria in F major (K III:21), MH 72
 Caelitum Joseph in F major, MH 261
 Canta Jerusalem in A major (K III:19), MH 269
 Cantate Domino in D major (lost), MH 97
 Cantate Domino in E-flat major, MH 325
 Cantate Domino in E minor (K III:44), MH 142
 Debitam morti in B-flat major (K III:20), MH 793
 Deus refugium in C major (K III:32), MH 222
 Diffusa est gratia in C major (K III:18), MH 281
 Dignare me in G major, MH 223
 Domine Deus salutis in G major (K III:22), MH 827
 Ecce Virgo suavis in C major, MH 121
 Eia corda exultate in C major (K III:39), MH 290
 Eia laeti exultemus in A major, MH 95
 Es amator in B-flat major, MH 640
 Et bracchium meum in A major, MH 116
 Ewiges Wesen in C major, MH 542
 Exaltabo te in C major (K III:25), MH 547
 Gebt acht ihr Hirten in G major, MH 216
 Grosse Frau in A major, MH 169
 Improperium expectavit in C major, MH 688
 In adoratione nostra in G major, MH 324
 In omnem terram in B-flat major (K III:41), MH 46
 Inveni David in C major, MH 115
 Inveni David in G major (K III:38), MH 224
 Justorum animae in A major (K III:37), MH 225
 Justorum animae in B-flat major, MH 286
 Laudate Dominum in C major (K III:31), MH 260
 Laudate Dominum in E-flat major (lost), MH A1
 Laudate populi in D major (K III:4), MH 792
 Lauft ihr Hirten in B-flat major, MH 217
 Leget alle Trauer in G major, MH 203
 Magnus Dominus in D minor (K III:23), MH 799
 Mutter der Gnaden in F major, MH 195
 Non me averte in B-flat major (K III:30), MH 123
 Nos conservat in D major, MH 122
 O caeli luminaria in F major (K III:8), MH 291
 O Maria in E-flat major (K III:33), MH 149
 O Maria Virgo in B-flat major, MH 165
 Perfice gressus meos in B-flat major (K III:27), MH 557
 Posuisti Domine in F major (K III:15), MH 248
 Quae est ista in C major, MH 226
 Qui nunc laeti in B minor (K III:35), MH 292
 Quicunque manducaverit in G minor (K III:9), MH 259
 Sic pater rector morum in G major (K III:36) (lost), MH A2
 Sicut servus in F major (K IIb:48), MH 143
 Steh auf in G major, MH 166
 Sub tuum praesidium in C major (K IIb:33), MH 654
 Sub tuum praesidium in C major (K IIb:34), MH 346
 Sub vestrum praesidium in F major (K III:34), MH 275
 Timete Dominum in G major, MH 256
 Tota pulchra es in D major, MH 139
 Tres sunt in C major (K IIa:40), MH 183
 Tubae resonate in C major, MH 124
 Unitis cordibus in C major, MH 293

Oratorios
 Der büssende Sünder (K VI:13), MH 147 (1771)
 Der Kampf der Busse und Bekehrung (K VI:10), MH 106 (1768)
 Der reumütige Petrus (K VI:11), MH 138 (1770)
 Der Tod Abels (Part III), MH 271
 Die Schuldigkeit des ersten Gebots (lost), MH 85
 Kaiser Constanstin I. Feldzug und Sieg, MH 117 (1769)
 Oratorio de Passione Dominum nostrum Jesu Christe, MH 202

Psalm settings
 4 German Choral Vespers (K VI:7a-d), MH 574
 Aus Davids Psalmen und biblischen Gesängen, MH 575
 Completorium in A major (K IV:7b), MH 114
 Completorium in C major (K IV:7a), MH 815
 German Vespers for Lent in G major (K VI:8b), MH 674
 German Miserere in F major (K VI:18), MH 811
 German Dixit and Magnificat in A major (K VI:23d&b), MH 517
 German Magnificat in F major (K VI:23a), MH 673
 German Magnificat in F major (K VI:23c) (lost), MH A3
 German Miserere in F major (K VI:18), MH 592
 Dixit Dominus in D major (K IV:3), MH 809
 Laudate pueri in A minor, MH 102
 Memento Domine David in G major (K IV:2a), MH 200
 Vesperae de Confessore in A minor, MH 214
 Vesperae de Dominica in A major (K IV:4), MH 58
 Vesperae de Dominica in C major (K IV:6), MH 321
 Vesperae in A major (K IV:1b), MH 304
 Vesperae in F major (K IV:1a), MH 294
 Vesperae pro festo SS Innocentium in F major (K IV:5), MH 548

Requiem
 Missa pro Defunctis in B-flat major, MH 838
 Missa pro Defunctis in C minor, MH 559; Incorrectly attributed to Michael Haydn, written by Georg von Pasterwitz (1730–1803).
 Missa pro Defuncto Archiepiscopo Sigismundo (K I:8), MH 155

Other
 Am Kircheweihfest in C major, MH 543
 Aria de Passione Domine et adventu in B-flat major, MH 131
 Aria funebris in E-flat major, MH 303
 Aria in Festis Beata Virgine Mariae, MH deest
 Auf die Auferstehung in B-flat major, MH 684
 Auf! ihr Christen in F major (K VI:20), MH 267
 Cantata de Nativitate Domini in D major, MH 262
 Dank dem Geber, Dank! in C major, MH 178
 Dankt dem Herrn in G major, MH 735
 Deinem Heiland, MH deest
 Deutscher Segen I in C major (fragment), MH 678
 Deutscher Segen II in C major (fragment), MH 679
 Deutscher Segen in B-flat major, MH 680
 Dich grüßen wir in E major, MH 301
 Dominus firmamentum in B-flat major, MH 655
 Ein träger Berg in D major, MH 196
 Erhebe o Sünder in F major, MH 266
 Erhebet euch ihr Augenlider in D major, MH 167
 Friedenslied in C major, MH 647
 Gekrönte Himmelskönigin in D major, MH 687
 Gerechter Herr in F major, MH 219
 Komm heiliger Geist in F major, MH 685
 Kommt her ihr Menschen in C major, MH 180
 Lobgesang de Venerabili Sacramento in C major (K VI:8a), MH 681
 Mutter des Lebens in F major (K VI:21), MH 555
 O glorreiche Himmel in C major, MH 168
 Rundgesang für eine Gesellschaft Studierender in A major, MH 645
 Rundgesang von Gottes Güte anstatt das Magnificat, MH 576
 Sacred piece for choir in C major (K VI:33a), MH 603
 Seele, Dein Heiland ist frei in B-flat major, MH 192
 Segne Jesu in D major (K VI:24d), MH 643
 Sei fröhlich mein Isaak in E-flat major, MH 170
 Stern auf diesem Lebensmeere in F major, MH 686
 Trauerode in C minor, MH 371
 Weihnachtslied: Heiligste Nacht in A major, MH 429
 Weihnachtslied: Heiligste Nacht in F major (K VI:28a), MH 427
 Weihnachtslied: Heiligste Nacht in G major, MH 461
 Weihnachtslied: Wie trostreich in D major (K VI:28b), MH 428
 Weihnachtslied: Wie trostreich in F major, MH 430
 Wenn ich o Schöpfer in G major, MH 567
 Wer nur den lieben Gott in C major (K VI:26), MH 682
 Wie lieblich ist doch, Herr in F major, MH 683

Secular vocal music

Arias
 Ah! ingrato m'inganni in B-flat major (lost), MH 70
 Commercelied in D major, MH 558
 Duetto without text in G major, MH 545
 Freundschaft, du Zucker in F major (lost), MH 349
 Hier mahlt sie sich im Hain, MH 300
 Lied der Recruten in D major, MH 296
 Liedchen für den Feldwebel in B-flat major, MH 297
 Morgenlied der Bauern in D major, MH 298

Canons
 Canon without text in G major, MH 544
 Adam hat sieben Söhn' in F major, MH 699
 Allegremente tutti in C major, MH 232
 Amar vorrei in C major, MH 233
 Canoni voi volite in G major, MH 234
 Che viver vuol contento in G major, MH 235
 Comincio solo in C major, MH 236
 Dall' amoroso in G minor, MH 237
 Der arme Sünder in G minor, MH 700
 Die Gans bebrüht das Gänschen in B-flat major, MH 612
 Die Mässigkeit in C major, MH 709
 Die Mutter an ihr Luischen in E major, MH 801
 Dulce loquentem in E major, MH 701
 Dum loquimur in F major, MH 702
 Ecce quam bonum in C major, MH 703
 Ecce quam bonum in E-flat major, MH 814
 Ecce quam bonum in F major, MH 698a
 Ehr' sei dem Vater in C major, MH 704
 Einladung in unsern Garten zu Arnsdorf in B-flat major, MH 581
 Elle avait une beauté in A minor, MH 802
 Elle avait une beauté in C major, MH 803
 Es lebe Taddeo in G major, MH 617
 Es legte Adam sich im Paradies in A major, MH 705
 Es packe Dich in F major, MH 577
 Est! est! est! in G major, MH 706
 Fra' Matino in C major, MH 238
 Frater Caspar Decini in G major, MH 583
 Già che viene in C major, MH 239
 Glück fehl Dir in G major, MH 582
 Guten Morgen in F major, MH 206
 Hätt i glaubt in F major, MH 707
 Herzige Nani in E-flat major, MH 618
 Ich und Du in F major, MH 708
 La mia signora in A minor, MH 240
 Le son de cloche in E-flat major, MH 804
 Le vin blanc in A major, MH 805
 Mailied in D major, MH 589
 Mein Dämä, mein Fingä in F major, MH 710
 Mi foppen in C major, MH 711
 Mio ben io moro in B minor, MH 241
 O Mensch gedenk in E-flat major, MH 712
 O wie schmecket in F major, MH 713
 Per ti mio ben in A minor, MH 243
 Perchè vezzosi rai in A major, MH 242
 Plato, Cicero in F major, MH 714
 Questi son canoni in B-flat major, MH 244
 Se tu mi vuoi in C major, MH 246
 Sei sanft wie ihre Seele in E minor, MH 715
 Sei stets bescheiden in F major, MH 716
 Senza di te, ben mio in F major, MH 245
 Sie ist's nicht wert in C major, MH 717
 Sintemal und all' die Weilen in F major, MH 641
 Tauch an in E-flat major, MH 718
 Tempora mutantur in D major, MH 719
 Tre dolci e cari nomi in F major, MH 247
 Ut re mi fa in C major, MH 720
 Vinum latificat cor hominis in F major, MH 721
 Vom Glück sei alles in B-flat major, MH 619
 Vorgetan und nachgedacht in B-flat major, MH 722
 Was i beim Tag in E minor, MH 723
 Wer nicht liebt Weib in F major, MH 724
 Wer nicht liebt Wein in G major, MH 725
 Wer reines Herzens ist in G major, MH 726
 Wohlsein, Freude in C major, MH 584

Cantatas
 An Ferdinand, Kurfürst zu Salzburg (lost), MH 821
 Applausus: Amor subditorum, MH 289
 Applausus: Damon et Galathea, MH 144
 Applausus: Der fröliche Wiederschein (K VI:30), MH 527
 Attale e Erimene, MH 11
 Der deutsche Kaiser Joseph in F major, MH 512
 Der gute Hirt, MH 181
 Gelegenheits-Cantate: Patritius, MH 668
 Grabet mit fleissigen Händen in C minor (K VI:22), MH 636
 Hochzeitlied in G major, MH 607
 Nach dem Abzuge der Franzosen (keyboard), MH 795
 Nach dem Abzuge der Franzosen (orchester), MH 794
 Ninfe in belli semplicete, MH 73
 Schäffer-Kantate, MH 455

Part-songs
 Abendempfindung in D major, MH 728
 Abendlied in G major, MH 784
 Abschied eines Biedermannes in C major, MH 787
 Am Grabe in B-flat major, MH 729
 An alle Deutsche in E-flat major, MH 775
 An Decini in C major, MH 613
 An den Hain zu Aigen in C major, MH 832
 An den Herrn von Moll in E-flat major, MH 834
 An die Freude in C major, MH 739
 An die Sonne in E-flat major, MH 730
 An Ignatia in D major, MH 599
 An unsern Garten in D major, MH 604
 Auf den Tod eines Hündchens in C major, MH 812
 Bierlied in F major, MH 780
 Chor beim Vögelfangen in B-flat major, MH 727
 Commercelied in D major, MH 822
 Coppia si tenera in A major, MH 689
 Coppia si tenera in A major (improved version), MH 690
 Dankesempfindung in C major, MH 630
 Das Gebet in G minor, MH 627
 Das Kammerfenster in G major, MH 749
 Das Landleben in B-flat major, MH 782
 Das Liedchen von der Ruh in A major, MH 579
 Der Arme in F major, MH 731
 Der Bund in D major, MH 734
 Der Invalid an sein Holzbein in G minor, MH 817
 Der Invalid an seinen Fleischtopf in G major, MH 774
 Der Morgen im Lenz in F major, MH 758
 Der Obersulzer Wein in A major, MH 697
 Der Sänger in E-flat major, MH 785
 Der Wechsel in A major, MH 770
 Die alten und heutigen Sitten in F major, MH 564
 Die Biene in E-flat major, MH 733
 Die Elfen in A major, MH 665
 Die Feierabendstunde in G major, MH 820
 Die Schweitzer in E major, MH 692
 Die Unschuld an Nanette in F major, MH 580
 Die verlassene Mutter am Strome in E major, MH 818
 Die Wiedergenesung in F major, MH 698
 Ehrenlied in A major, MH 624
 Ein Lied von der Behutsamkeit in D major, MH 753
 Ein Lied von der Geduld in F major, MH 755
 Eintracht in F major, MH 737
 Einweihung in B-flat major, MH 597
 Ermunterungslied in C major, MH 666
 Es kann ja nicht immer so bleiben in A major, MH 738
 Freundchaft! wie heilig in D major, MH 740
 Freundschaftslied in F major, MH 615
 Freundschaftslied in G major, MH 667
 Friedenslied in C major, MH 644
 Frühlingslied in G major, MH 620
 Gesund und frohen Mutes in C major, MH 742
 Gott erhalte Franz den Kaiser in G major, MH 825
 Grabe, Spaden! in C major, MH 743
 Herbstlied in G minor, MH 744
 Holde Sittsamkeit in B-flat major, MH 745
 Hymne an Gott in B-flat major, MH 588
 Ja, Dämon in F major, MH 747
 Josephe in A major, MH 788
 Jugendglück in G major, MH 748
 Lebensweisheit in A major, MH 752
 Lied der Freiheit in D major, MH 608
 Lied im Grünen in G major, MH 659
 Lob des Sanges in G major, MH 816
 Meine Grille in F major, MH 756
 Meiner Freunde Gesinnungen in D major, MH 614
 Mit frommen Eifer in C major, MH 539
 Monsieur Hans in E-flat major, MH 657
 Nacht und Still' in A-flat major, MH 759
 Pein der Liebe in C major, MH 761
 Sagt wo sind die Veilchen in G major, MH 632
 Schön ist das Leben in F major, MH 646
 Sehnsucht nach dem Landleben in C major, MH 833
 Sehnsucht nach Liebe in A major, MH 648
 Seufzer in A major, MH 765
 Silenzio facciasi in B-flat major, MH 691
 Singt heilig in E major, MH 565
 Ständchen in A major, MH 594
 Ständchen in E-flat major (3 parts), MH 777
 Ständchen in E-flat major (4 parts), MH 778
 Stille! Stille! in G major, MH 766
 Tauch an mein lieba Schiffmann in G major (lost), MH A6
 Tischgebet aus der Schöpfung in E-flat major, MH 791
 Tischgebet in B-flat major, MH 768
 Tischlied in C major, MH 585
 Trinklied im Freien in F major, MH 790
 Trinklied im Winter in A major, MH 590
 Trinklied in B-flat major, MH 661
 Trinklied in B-flat major (revised version), MH 662
 Trinklied in C major, MH 769
 Trinklied in E major, MH 622
 Türkisches Kriegslied in F major, MH 649
 Türkisches Kriegslied in F major (improved version), MH 663
 Verwandlungen in G major, MH 591
 Von ihr in D major, MH 781
 Was ists dass ich mich in C major, MH 540
 Zu ihr! Zu ihr! in A major, MH 776

Operas
 Andromeda e Perseo, MH 438

Serenatas
 Endimione, MH 186

Singspiele
 Beschluss-Arie in C major, MH 295
 Das Hahnenangeschrei (lost), MH A4
 Der Bassgeiger zu Wörgl, MH 205
 Der englische Patriot, MH 285
 Der Schulmeister, MH 204
 Die Ährenleserin, MH 493
 Die Hochzeit auf der Alm, MH 107
 Die Hochzeit auf der Alm (supplemental music), MH 218
 Die Wahrheit der Natur, MH 118
 Rebekka als Braut (K VI:17), MH 76
 Tändlmarkt (lost), MH A5

Songs
 An den Herrn von Moll in E-flat major, MH 835
 An Ignatia in D minor, MH 566
 An unsern Garten in D major, MH 605
 Auch die Sprödeste der Schönen in F major, MH 462
 Auf den Tod des Herrn Schachtners in G major, MH 598
 Auf den Tod eines Hündchens in C major, MH 813
 Das Liedchen von der Ruh in A major, MH 587
 Der Arme in F major, MH 732
 Der couragierte Schneidergesell in C major, MH 807
 Der frühe Bund in B-flat major, MH 586
 Der Sänger in E-flat major, MH 786
 Der Tanzbär in A major, MH 767
 Die alten und heutigen Sitten in F major, MH 563
 Die Feierabendstunde in G major, MH 549
 Die Rose in F major, MH 762
 Die Seligkeit der Liebe in A major, MH 783
 Die verlassene Mutter am Strome in E major, MH 819
 Ein Lied zur Prüfung für Schulkinder in B-flat major, MH 754
 Einladung zum Landleben in E major, MH 736
 Einweihung in B-flat major, MH 606
 Feuer zu werden in D major, MH 450
 Freundschaftslied in F major, MH 616
 Frühlingslied in G major, MH 621
 Gehorsam ist die erste Pflicht in G major, MH 741
 Glückwunsch in F major, MH 578
 Gott! vor Dir in C major, MH 537
 Ich bin ein Mädchen aus Schwaben in F major, MH 746
 Josephe in A major, MH 789
 Komm lieber Mai in C major, MH 750
 Könnt' ich mein Liebchen kaufen in A major, MH 751
 Lied der Freiheit in D major, MH 609
 Lied im Grünen in G major, MH 660
 Mein Vergnügen in B-flat major, MH 757
 Mit frommen Eifer in C major, MH 538
 Monsieur Hans in E-flat major, MH 658
 Nichts ist schlauer als die Liebe in G major, MH 760
 Rose, lass Dich küssen in F major, MH 763
 Sagt wo sind die Veilchen in G major, MH 631
 Sauf, Du alter Gassenschlängel in F major, MH 808
 Scherzend unter Necktar-Küssen in D major, MH 764
 Schon grünen die Hecker in A major, MH 633
 Ständchen in A major, MH 593
 Ständchen in E-flat major, MH 779
 Tischlied in G major, MH 626
 Trinklied in E major, MH 623
 Was ists dass ich mich in C major, MH 541

Notes

References
 Charles H. Sherman and T. Donley Thomas, Johann Michael Haydn (1737–1806), a chronological thematic catalogue of his works. Stuyvesant, New York: Pendragon Press (1993)
 C. Sherman, "Johann Michael Haydn" in The Symphony: Salzburg, Part 2 London: Garland Publishing (1982): lxiii - lxx

Haydn, Michael